George Francis O'Shaunessy (May 1, 1868November 28, 1934) was an American politician. He was born in 1868 in Galway, Ireland and immigrated to New York in 1872.  After attending Columbia College Law School, he was admitted to the bar of New York in 1889.  He served as deputy attorney general of New York in 1904 and 1905 and as assistant corporation counsel of New York City in 1906.

He moved to Rhode Island in 1907 and was elected as a Democrat to Congress representing Rhode Island's 1st Congressional District in 1910.  He remained a Representative until 1919, having declined to run in 1918 in order to seek (unsuccessfully) election as a U.S. Senator.

O'Shaunessy then was appointed by President Woodrow Wilson collector of internal revenue for the district of Rhode Island. He served in that position until Wilson left office in 1921, when he returned to the practice of law.

He died in Providence in 1934. He was buried in St. Francis Cemetery in Pawtucket, Rhode Island.

References

19th-century Irish people
20th-century Irish people
People from Galway (city)
People from County Galway
Irish emigrants to the United States (before 1923)
1868 births
1934 deaths
Democratic Party members of the United States House of Representatives from Rhode Island
Columbia Law School alumni